Vladimir Vladimirovich Tatarchuk (born 20 September 1987) is a former Russian professional footballer. 

He made his professional debut in the Russian Second Division in 2008 for FC Krasnodar.

He is a son of Vladimir Tatarchuk.

Honours
 Russian Cup winner: 2006 (played 2 games in the tournament).

References

1987 births
Footballers from Moscow
Living people
Russian footballers
Russian people of Ukrainian descent
PFC CSKA Moscow players
FC Krasnodar players
PFC Spartak Nalchik players
FC Torpedo Moscow players
Russian Premier League players
FC Fakel Voronezh players
Association football midfielders